The 1997–98 European Challenge Cup was the second year of the European Challenge Cup, the second tier rugby union cup competition below the Heineken Cup. The tournament was held between September 1997 and February 1998

Pool stage

Pool 1

Pool 2

Pool 3

Pool 4

Pool 5

Pool 6

Pool 7

Pool 8

Qualifiers

Knockout stage

Quarter-finals

Semi-finals

Final

See also

European Challenge Cup
1997-98 Heineken Cup

 
1997–98 rugby union tournaments for clubs
1997-98
1997–98 in European rugby union
1997–98 in English rugby union
1997–98 in French rugby union
1997–98 in Irish rugby union
1997–98 in Italian rugby union
1997–98 in Romanian rugby union
1997–98 in Scottish rugby union
1997–98 in Welsh rugby union